Messier 39 or M39, also known as NGC 7092, is an open cluster of stars in the constellation of Cygnus, positioned two degrees to the south of the star Pi Cygni and around 9° east-northeast of Deneb. The cluster was discovered by Guillaume Le Gentil in 1749, then Charles Messier added it to his catalogue in 1764. When observed in a small telescope at low power the cluster shows around two dozen members but is best observed with binoculars. It has a total integrated magnitude (brightness) of 5.5 and spans an angular diameter of  – about the size of the full Moon.

Of the 15 brightest components, six form binary star systems; one more is suspected. HD 205117 is a probable eclipsing binary system with a period of 113.2 days that varies by 0.051 in visual magnitude. Both members seem to be subgiants. Within are at least five chemically peculiar stars and ten suspected short-period variable stars.

Map

See also
 List of Messier objects

References

External links

 Messier 39, SEDS Messier pages

 

Messier 039
Orion–Cygnus Arm
Messier 039
039
Messier 039
17641024